Misa or MISA may refer to:

Characters
 Pixy Misa (ピクシィミサ), a character in the anime Magical Girl Pretty Sammy
 Misa Amane (弥 海砂), a character in the manga, anime and film Death Note
 Misa Arashiyama (嵐山 美佐), a character in the toksatsu Taiyou Sentai Sun Vulcan
 Misa Hayase (早瀬 未沙), one of the central characters of the Macross series
 Misa Kakizaki (柿崎 美砂), a character in the Negima! anime and manga series
 Misa Kurobane (くろばね みさ), a character in the anime television series Charlotte

People
 G3 Misa, a Filipino singer/songwriter
 Misa Bharti, Indian politician
 Misa Eguchi (江口実沙), Japanese tennis player
 Misa Etō (衛藤 美彩), Japanese gravure idol
 Misa Matsushima (松島美紗), Japanese fighter pilot
 Misa Amano (天野 美沙), Japanese swimmer
 Misa Tamagawa (玉川 美沙), Japanese radio show host
 Misa Yamamura (山村 美紗), Japanese novelist 
 Misa Shimizu (清水美沙), a Japanese actress who appears regularly in Masayuki Suo's films
 Misa Kuranaga (倉永美沙), Japanese ballerina
 Misa Uehara (actress, born 1937) (上原美佐), a Japanese actress most notable for her roles in The Hidden Fortress and Storm Over the Pacific
, a Japanese voice actress
 Misa, bass player for the Japanese rock band Band-Maid

Places
 Misa (Etruscan village), an Etruscan village in Emilia-Romagna, Italy
 Misa River, in Semigallia, Latvia
 Misa (river in Italy), a river in the Marche region
 Mişä, Tatar name for the Myosha River
 Misa, Lucknow, a village in Uttar Pradesh, India

Rivers
 Misa (river in Italy)
 Misa (river in Latvia)
 Misa River, A small river in Assam, India

Other uses
 569 Misa, an asteroid
 Maintenance of Internal Security Act, a 1971 Indian law
 Media Institute of Southern Africa
 Media Institute of Southern Africa (MISA) Malawi
 Miahnhada, Saranghanda (미안하다 사랑한다, shortened to "Misa": I'm Sorry, I Love You), a Korean TV drama
 Misa (moth), a genus of moths in the family Noctuidae
 Míša, a frozen Czech treat

See also
 MISA (disambiguation)

Japanese feminine given names